The 1997 Trans America Athletic Conference baseball tournament was held at Conrad Park on the campus of Stetson in DeLand, Florida. This was the nineteenth tournament championship held by the Trans America Athletic Conference.  won their fourth tournament championship in five years, and third in a row, and earned the conference's automatic bid to the 1997 NCAA Division I baseball tournament.

Format and seeding 
The top six finishers by overall winning percentage qualified for the tournament, with the top seed playing the lowest seed in the first round. Florida Atlantic and Jacksonville State did not qualify as they completed their transition from NCAA Division II.

Bracket

All-Tournament Team 
The following players were named to the All-Tournament Team.

Most Valuable Player 
Greg Pacitti was named Tournament Most Valuable Player. Pacitti was an outfielder for UCF.

References 

Tournament
ASUN Conference Baseball Tournament
Trans America Athletic Conference baseball tournament